Les Jackson (born December 21, 1952) is a Canadian former professional ice hockey player, coach, scout and  co-general manager of the Dallas Stars.  Jackson is currently the director of scouting and player development for the Stars.  Jackson was selected in the 4th round of the 1972 NHL Amateur Draft, 64th overall, by the Boston Bruins.  Jackson had a brief and unspectacular minor league career, never reaching the NHL, and is better known as a manager than as a player.

Jackson retired following the 1976–77 season, and was named head coach of the Great Falls Americans of the WHL prior to the 1979–80 season, his team going 2–25–1, until it folded on December 26, 1979.  For the next two seasons, Jackson coached the Brandon Wheat Kings, and then served as their general manager for two seasons following that.  Before the 1985–86 season Jackson joined the Minnesota North Stars as an assistant coach, and stayed with the franchise in one capacity or another until September 1, 1999, when he joined the Atlanta Thrashers as assistant general manager.

On July 6, 2000, Jackson rejoined the Dallas Stars, and was named interim co-general manager (along with Brett Hull) on November 13, 2007, and on May 22, 2008, the "interim" was removed from their title as both were signed to a 3-year deal to be co-general managers.  On May 31, 2009, Jackson and Hull were replaced by Joe Nieuwendyk as general manager, and reassigned to other roles within the Dallas Stars organization.

Jackson's contract was not renewed by the Stars after its expiration on June 30th, 2020, ending what was the longest tenure of any employee in the franchise's history at 33 years. He was also the final team employee in any capacity who still had a direct connection to the franchise's time in Minnesota.

References

External links

Jackson's bio at Hockey Draft Central

1952 births
Living people
Atlanta Thrashers executives
Boston Bruins draft picks
Brandon Wheat Kings coaches
Canadian ice hockey coaches
Canadian ice hockey left wingers
Dallas Stars executives
Dallas Stars personnel
Great Falls Americans (WHL) coaches
Ice hockey people from Alberta
Minnesota North Stars coaches
Minnesota North Stars executives
Minnesota North Stars scouts
National Hockey League executives
People from Manning, Alberta
Stanley Cup champions